Lakeview Cemetery is a privately owned cemetery located in Galveston, Texas between 57th and 59th Streets with its north side along Avenue T 1/2.

Notable burials 
 David G. Burnet (1788–1870), Republic of Texas President
 Norris Wright Cuney (1846–1898), politician, businessman, union leader, and African-American activist
 Walter Gresham (1841–1920), US Congressman from Texas's 10th congressional district
 Maud Cuney Hare (1874–1936), pianist, musicologist, writer, and African-American activist
 Robert B. Hawley (1849–1921), US Congressman from Texas's 10th congressional district
 Louis (Blues Boy) Jones (1931–1984), R&B singer and songwriter
 Sidney Sherman (1805–1873), cavalry commander in the Texas Revolution and the Republic of Texas

References

External links
 

Cemeteries in Galveston County, Texas